The Kadalur Point Lighthouse is situated in Kadalur, near Koyilandy in Kozhikode district on the coast of Arabian sea in India. The circular stone masonry tower has a height of 34 meters. The tower is painted with black and white bands. The lighthouse started its operation in 1907. The light source is a metal halide lamp.

In the 18th Century Kadalur Point was known as Cotta Point. It is believed that the lighthouse was built after a shipwreck on the rocky shores at the point and one can still see the remains of it.

Gallery

See also 

 List of lighthouses in India

References

External links 

 

Lighthouses in Kerala
Buildings and structures in Kozhikode district
1907 establishments in India
Transport in Kozhikode district
Lighthouses completed in 1907